is a passenger railway station located in then city of  Misato, Saitama, Japan, operated by East Japan Railway Company (JR East).

Lines
Misato Station is served by the Musashino Line between Fuchūhommachi and Nishi-Funabashi, with some trains continuing to Tokyo via the Keiyō Line. It is located 53.4 kilometers from Fuchūhommachi Station and 82.2 kilometers from the official starting point of the line at Tsurumi Station.

Station layout
The station consists of two elevated side platforms serving two tracks, with the station building located underneath. The station is staffed.

Platforms

History
The station opened on 1 April 1973.

Passenger statistics
In fiscal 2019, the station was used by an average of 14,450 passengers daily (boarding passengers only).

Surrounding area
 Saitama Misato Kita High School

See also
 List of railway stations in Japan

References

External links

 JR East station information 

Railway stations in Japan opened in 1973
Stations of East Japan Railway Company
Railway stations in Saitama Prefecture
Musashino Line
Misato, Saitama (city)